Saint-Julien-en-Genevois is a subprefecture of the Haute-Savoie department in the Auvergne-Rhône-Alpes region in Eastern France. In 2018, the commune had a population of 15,509.

Geography

The commune of Saint Julien-en-Genevois also consists of the following villages: Thairy, Crâche, Thérens, Norcier, Ternier, Lathoy.

Population

Economy 
In 2007, there were 4,491 jobs in Saint-Julien-en-Genevois and 5,401 active inhabitants. However, 46,1% of active inhabitants were working in neighbouring Switzerland. The unemployment rate stood at 10,6%, twice as high as in the neighbouring rural and residential communes.

Culture 
Every Summer, a rock-oriented music festival called "Guitare en Scène" is held in Saint-Julien-en-Genevois.

Twin town
Saint-Julien-en-Genevois has been twinned with Mössingen, Germany, since 13 January 1990.

Gallery

See also
Communes of the Haute-Savoie department

References

External links

 Official town website 
 Official tourist office website 

Communes of Haute-Savoie
Subprefectures in France